The 1922–23 Swiss International Ice Hockey Championship was the eighth edition of the international ice hockey championship in Switzerland. EHC St. Moritz won the championship by defeating HC Château-d'Oex in the final.

First round

Eastern Series 
 EHC St. Moritz - HC Davos 6:2

EHC St. Moritz qualified for the final.

Western Series 
 HC Château-d'Oex - HC Rosey Gstaad 2:1

HC Château-d'Oex qualified for the final.

Final 
The final was played in Davos on February 11, 1923.

 EHC St. Moritz - HC Château-d'Oex 8:2

External links 
Swiss Ice Hockey Federation – All-time results

Inter
Swiss International Ice Hockey Championship seasons